Frank Ridley may refer to:
 Frank Ridley (secularist) (1897-1994), British Marxist and secularist
 Frank L. Ridley, American film and television actor
 Frank M. Ridley (1883-1953), American college football player and physician